José Omar Cervantes Hernández (born September 27, 1985) is a former Mexican football forward who last played for Atlante F.C., in the Primera División de México.

He debuted on April 10, 2005, for Atlante in a 3–0 win over Santos Laguna. He also scored his first goal on October 13, 2007, in a 2-1 losing effort against CF Pachuca.

Honors

Club
Atlante F.C.
  Apertura 2007

External links
 

1985 births
Living people
Liga MX players
Atlante F.C. footballers
Association football forwards
People from Ecatepec de Morelos
Footballers from the State of Mexico
Mexican footballers